La Chapelle-sur-Coise is a commune in the Rhône department in eastern France. The population is 568 people (2018).

The municipality is located about 390 km southeast of Paris, 33 km west of Lyon.

See also
Communes of the Rhône department

References

Communes of Rhône (department)